Laiva Dam is a dam in Falam Township, Falam District, Chin State in Burma (Myanmar), on the Lai Va River, a west flowing tributary of the Ṭio River. The 600-kilowatt facility was built by the Chinese firm Yunnan Machinery & Equipment Import & Export Co. (YMEC). It was completed in April 1994. The dam produces hydroelectric power for Falam and neighboring towns such as Hakha and Thantlang (Thlangtlang).

Notes

Dams in Myanmar
Dams completed in 1994